The Pere Marquette Rail-Trail (PMRT) is a rail trail in Michigan occupying a  abandoned CSX railroad corridor in Midland County and Isabella County that was once part of the Flint and Pere Marquette Railroad. In 1874, the tracks stretched from Ludington to Flint, transporting supplies to the timber industry in southern Michigan's mills. It is currently a Michigan Rails to Trails Conservancy Hall of Fame trail.

History

In the late 1980s, William C. Gibson and Paul D. Pounders worked with the County of Midland's Parks and Recreation Department and were at the forefront of the creation of the trail. 

The trail is named after the Flint and Pere Marquette Railroad, named after Jacques Marquette, a French Jesuit missionary who founded Michigan's first European settlement at Sault Ste. Marie. Père is the French word for father; ergo, Father Marquette.

The first portion of the trail opened in June 1993. This portion was almost wholly contained in the city of Midland and started at The Tridge.

Location

See also
 The Tridge

References

External links
Midland County Parks and Recreation: Pere Marquette Rail-Trail
Isabella County Parks and Recreation: Pere Marquette Rail-Trail
Description of the rail trail
Michigan State University: Pere Marquette Rail-Trail Research Study
 Pere Marquette Rail Trail Page at RailsToTrails.us
 YouTube Video: "Virtual Bike Ride: Pere Marquette Rail-Trail"

Rail trails in Michigan
Protected areas of Midland County, Michigan
Midland, Michigan
Protected areas of Isabella County, Michigan
CSX Transportation
Protected areas established in 1993
1993 establishments in Michigan